This is a list of chapters of the Japanese manga series The Promised Neverland, written by Kaiu Shirai and illustrated by Posuka Demizu. The individual chapters were originally serialized in Shueisha's Weekly Shōnen Jump, from August 1, 2016 to June 15, 2020, with 181 chapters in all; The chapters were collected in twenty tankōbon volumes. The series has been licensed for English-language release by Viz Media. The first printed volume in North America was released on December 5, 2017.

A 16-page one-shot spin-off chapter about the character Ray titled, The First Shot was published in Weekly Shōnen Jump on October 5, 2020. A 36-page one-shot chapter about the character of Sister Krone titled, Seeking the Sky of Freedom was published in Weekly Shōnen Jump on December 7, 2020. A 19-page one-shot chapter titled, Dreams Come True was released at "The Promised Neverland Special Exhibition", event that was held in Tokyo from December 2020 to January 2021. A 32-page one-shot chapter about the character Isabella titled, A Mother's Determination was published in Weekly Shōnen Jump on December 14, 2020. A 32-page one-shot, titled We Were Born, was published in Weekly Shōnen Jump on January 4, 2021.



Volumes list

Related volume

Side stories not yet collected in volumes
 The First Shot - Published on October 5, 2020
 Seeking the Sky of Freedom - Published on December 7, 2020
 A Mother's Determination - Published on December 14, 2020

References

External links

  
  
  at Weekly Shōnen Jump 
  at Viz Media
 

Promised Neverland, The